Trestonia morrisi is a species of beetle in the family Cerambycidae. It was described by Martins and Galileo in 2005. It is known from Panama and Bolivia.

References

morrisi
Beetles described in 2005